Aaron Lipstadt (born November 12, 1952) is an American film director, television director and producer.

In 1980, he began his career as assistant production manager on the film Battle Beyond the Stars. He continued to manage productions for the films Saturday the 14th (1981), Galaxy of Terror (1981), Forbidden World (1982) and The Slumber Party Massacre (1982). In 1982, he made his directorial debut with the film Android. In 1984, he directed the film City Limits.

Since 1986, he has focused primarily on directing television. His television credits include Miami Vice, Crime Story, The Equalizer, Quantum Leap, Law & Order, Law & Order: Special Victims Unit, Law & Order: Trial by Jury, The Division, Medium, The 4400, Elementary and many other series.

Filmography
Actor

References

External links

1952 births
American television directors
Living people
People from Southington, Connecticut
Film directors from Connecticut
Film producers from Connecticut
Television producers from Connecticut